Conversation with a Devil is the eleventh album released by rapper Andre Nickatina. It was released on April 22, 2003 for Fillmoe Coleman Records and was produced by Andre Nickatina, Nick Peace, Krushadelic and Smoov-E. Packaged with the album was a movie also entitled Conversation with a Devil. Conversation with a Devil peaked at #3 on the Billboard's Top Heatseekers chart  and was named one of the top "coke rap" albums ever by Rhapsody (online music service).

Track listing
"Conversation with a Devil"- 3:34
"Fly Like a Bird"- 3:53
"Rise and Fall of a Rap Cat"- 3:00
"Pick-Cha"- 2:39
"Dice of Life" (The Bottle)- 3:43
"5th Gear"- 3:52
"Soul of a Coke Dealer"- 4:02
"The God and the Stripper"- 3:47
"Falcon and the Snowman"- 3:24
"Summer in Florida"- 3:34
"Ayo for Yayo"- 3:14 (Featuring San Quinn)
"Fist Full of Dollars Green Eyes"- 2:04
"Train with No Love"- 4:40
"Nino Did the Cartah"- 3:23
"Show Gone Wrong"- 3:28

References

2003 albums
Andre Nickatina albums